Horseferry Road is a street in the City of Westminster in central London running between Millbank and Greycoat Place. It is perhaps best known as the site of City of Westminster Magistrates' Court (which until 2006 was called Horseferry Road Magistrates' Court).  The ubiquity of the Magistrates' Court in newspaper crime reports means that the road name has wide recognition in the UK. Other notable institutions which are or have been located on Horseferry Road include Broadwood and Sons, the Gas Light and Coke Company, British Standards Institution, the Royal College of Veterinary Surgeons, the Burberry Group, the Environment Agency headquarters in Horseferry House, the National Probation Service, the Department for Transport and Channel 4. The Marsham Street Home Office building backs on to this road.

The road is designated part of the B323 road, along with Greycoat Place, Artillery Row and Buckingham Gate.

The road takes its name from the ferry which existed on the site of what is now Lambeth Bridge. Owned by the Archbishop of Canterbury, the ferry was an important crossing over the Thames, from Westminster Palace to Lambeth Palace. The earliest known reference to the ferry dates to 1513, but there may have been a ford near the site in Roman times.  The ferry pier was the starting point for the flight of King James II from England in 1689. In 1736, Princess Augusta, who became the mother of George III, crossed the Thames via the horse ferry on the way to her wedding.

In 1734, plans were drawn up for a bridge to replace the ferry. An Act of Parliament was passed in 1736, and the money was raised by lottery and grants. Parliament changed the plans for the position of the bridge, and Westminster Bridge was finished first, resulting in the gradual decline of the ferry.  It was eventually replaced on 10 November 1862, when the first Lambeth Bridge was opened.  It quickly deteriorated, and was replaced in 1932.

Horseferry Road has been the site of numerous Government buildings including Horseferry House, which was the location of No. 5 (London) Regional Fire Control Centre during World War II, and the headquarters of 26th Middlesex (Cyclist) Volunteer Rifle Corps. The building was most recently used by the Home Office to house Prison and Probation head office staff, and is as of 2007 being converted into residential flats.

The regimental headquarters and museum of the London Scottish Regiment is at no. 95, this was where the inquiry into the sinking of RMS Titanic took place in 1912.

During World War I the Australian Imperial Force's Administrative Headquarters was located on Horseferry Road. They rented the buildings from Westminster Training College throughout the war while the college was evacuated to Richmond.
Established by the Methodist Church in 1851, Westminster College occupied the site until it relocated to Oxford in 1959. Today their Oxford site is the Harcourt Hill Campus of Oxford Brookes University, but the archives and art collections of Westminster College can still be viewed on the site. Their site on Horseferry Road meanwhile is now the location for the Channel 4 Headquarters, which were built there in 1994.

Phyllis Pearsall conceived and created the London A to Z map while living in a bedsit in Horseferry Road.

There is another Horseferry Road in Limehouse, London E14 parallel to Narrow Street, and another off Creek Road in Greenwich.

References

Streets in the City of Westminster